The Bayanihan Act and the Bayanihan Law may refer to:
Bayanihan to Heal as One Act
Bayanihan to Recover as One Act
Bayanihan to Arise as One Bill